Surat Davud oghlu Huseynov (born 12 February 1959) is an Azerbaijani colonel and ex-Prime Minister of Azerbaijan, who rose to prominence during the First Nagorno-Karabakh War. His military career led, in 1993, to his rise to Prime Minister and later prison term.

Prior to the war
After serving in the army in 1977–1979 and later graduating from the Leninabad Technological Institute, Surat Huseynov worked as a plumber, a warehouse employee and an assistant operator at the Kirovabad Textile Factory. In 1983–1984 he resided in Novopavlovsk, Russia. For the next two years he worked as a wool sorter at a storing department in Shaki, Azerbaijan. In 1986 he became senior inspector of a textile factory in Yevlakh and was promoted to manager just before the war. He was considered one of key figures in Soviet Azerbaijan's black market and was known for having funded the sovereigntist Popular Front of Azerbaijan in the late Soviet era. He is married and has two children.

First Nagorno-Karabakh War
At the dawn of the conflict in 1990, Huseynov formed an armed group supported by the local Soviet Ground Forces division. He has been reported to have originated the group in Yevlakh. In summer 1992, his detachment took part in the Azerbaijani offensive which led to the capture of Mardakert on 4 July 1992.

Ganja revolt
The Popular Front of Azerbaijan blamed Huseynov for treason and for intentionally ceding the villages around Mardakert to Armenians (allowing their advance into Kalbajar region) to benefit Russian geopolitical interests in the region. After the remaining Soviet turned Russian troops left Ganja on 28 May 1993, President Abulfaz Elchibey initiated a military operation called Tufan aimed at arresting Huseynov and disarming his detachments. Elchibey deployed 4,000 troops led by Minister of Defence Dadash Rzayev, Commander of Internal Forces Fahmin Hajiyev and Attorney General Ikhtiyar Shirinov to Ganja. On 4 June 1993, at 6 o'clock in the morning, the two groups confronted each other, however not only did the Presidential Guard fail to disarm Huseynov, but the latter quickly defeated it. The number of casualties on both sides, as well as among civilians, was 69. Attorney General Ikhtiyar Shirinov among others was taken hostage, while Dadash Rzayev and Fahmin Hajiyev fled Ganja. Surat Huseynov demanded that Ikhtiyar Shirinov signed a warrant for President Elchibey's arrest on grounds of conspiracy, murder, and abuse of power, which was exercised immediately. Within several days Huseynov extended his control onto the neighbouring regions without meeting any opposition and started advancing toward the capital city of Baku. Upon Huseynov's approach on 18 June, Elchibey secretly fled the capital to his native village of Kalaki in Nakhchivan. Heydar Aliyev who had just returned to Baku from Nakhchivan City and was elected Chairman of the Supreme Council of Azerbaijan on 15 June, was subsequently voted to take over presidency in the country. On 27–29 June, Aliyev negotiated with Surat Huseynov, and as a result the latter agreed to stop his advance on the capital city in exchange to becoming Prime Minister of Azerbaijan with extensive authority over the Ministry of National Security of Azerbaijan, Ministry of Defence and Ministry of Internal Affairs. On 30 June, the National Assembly of Azerbaijan elected Huseynov to the requested office.

Escape, conviction and later release
Surat Huseynov, now Prime Minister, reportedly expressed dissatisfaction with Heydar Aliyev signing the so-called "Contract of the Century" with the international oil consortium AIOC, which allowed Western companies to extract Azerbaijani oil in the Caspian Sea. According to Huseynov, such infringement of Russian interests in the region would not lead to positive outcomes for Azerbaijan. Some saw that as a manifestation of Huseynov's pro-Russian agenda which went back to his active contacts with Russian military commanders in 1990–1993. On 5 October 1994, riot squads reportedly accompanied by Huseynov's units attempted a coup d'état, supported by the military, against Aliyev, which was immediately suppressed. Huseynov fled to Russia. Negotiations with the Russian government resulted in Huseynov's extradition to Azerbaijan on 26 March 1997, where he was charged with treason and attempted coup, among other crimes. The arrest was performed simultaneously with the signing of the Treaty of Friendship and Cooperation between Azerbaijan and Russia, and a contract by which the Russian oil company LUKoil was to exploit the oil field of Yalama. On 15 February 1999, Surat Huseynov was sentenced to life in prison (highest form of punishment in Azerbaijan). In 2004, under pressure from the Organization for Security and Co-operation in Europe, President Ilham Aliyev pardoned him. Huseynov was released and now lives a secluded life in the town of Buzovna, near Baku.

References

Azerbaijani colonels
Military personnel from Ganja, Azerbaijan
Azerbaijani military personnel of the Nagorno-Karabakh War
1959 births
Living people
Warlords
Politicians from Ganja, Azerbaijan
Prime Ministers of Azerbaijan
Azerbaijani prisoners and detainees
People extradited to Azerbaijan
Prisoners and detainees of Azerbaijan